Level I BASIC is a dialect of the BASIC programming language that shipped with the first TRS-80, the TRS-80 Model I.

Background
Tandy-employee Steve Leininger had written the first draft of the NIBL (National Industrial Basic Language) BASIC interpreter for the SC/MP while employed at National Semiconductor
. Unable to take that source code with him, he initially hired a consultant to write an interpreter. When that contractor failed to deliver, he adapted Li-Chen Wang's public domain version of Tiny BASIC for the original prototype of the TRS-80 Model I. This required only 2 KB of memory for the interpreter, leaving an average of another 2 KB free for user programs in common 4 KB memory layouts of early machines.

During a demonstration to executives, Tandy Corporation's then-President Charles Tandy tried to enter his salary but was unable to do so. This was because Tiny BASIC used 2-byte signed integers with a maximum value of 32,767. The result was a request for floating-point math for the production version.

This led to the replacement of the existing 16-bit integer code with a version using 32-bit single-precision floating-point numbers. Leininger further extended the language to support input/output routines (keyboard, CRT, and reading and writing from cassettes). The language fit within 4 KB of ROM.

In a presentation announcing the TRS-80, Leininger said, "What we did, we went back through the Wang Basic and completely tore out about 60 per cent of it, the integer overhead and all that kind of stuff."

Further Development

When the TRS-80 was introduced, three versions of BASIC were announced:
 Level I BASIC
 Level II BASIC - developed by Microsoft and using 12 KB of ROM to add string handling, error handling, trigonometric and other dedicated functions
 Level III BASIC - also developed by Microsoft, offering disk commands

The Level I language was not available for the TRS-80 Model II but briefly re-surfaced as the baseline package for the TRS-80 Model III in 1981, selling for $699 compared to the $999 system with Model III BASIC (another Microsoft product). The language was identical to the Model I version but with the addition of two commands, the LLIST and the LPRINT, to output to a printer.

Language features
Level I BASIC supported the following keywords:
 Commands: NEW, RUN, LIST, CONT (to continue or resume a program from a breakpoint)
 Statements: PRINT, INPUT, READ, DATA, RESTORE, LET
 Print modifiers: AT, TAB
 Structure: GOTO, GOSUB, ON-GOTO, ON-GOSUB, RETURN, IF-THEN (but no ELSE), FOR-TO-STEP/NEXT, STOP, END
 Graphics: CLS, SET, RESET, POINT()
 Functions: ABS(), INT(), RND(), MEM
 Math: + - * /
 Relational operators: < > = <= => <>
 Logical operators: * (AND) + (OR)

Like Palo Alto Tiny BASIC on which it was based, Level I BASIC did not tokenize keywords like Microsoft BASIC but used abbreviations to reduce the amount of memory used by keywords, such as F. for FOR, G. for GOTO, P. for PRINT, and T. for THEN.

The language supported 26 single-precision variables A to Z, two strings A$ and B$ (limited to 16 characters each), and one pre-defined array A(). The language lacked a DIM statement for dimensioning the array, the size of which was determined by available memory not used by the program listing (4 bytes per item). As the language lacked many common math functions, the manual provided subroutine listings for square root, exponentiation, exponentials, logarithms, arithmetic sign, and trigonometry functions.

The coordinates could be any expression and ranged from 0 to 127 for the X-axis and 0 to 47 for the Y-axis. Only black-and-white display was supported.

References

External links 
 TRS-80 Level I BASIC Simulator
 Conklin Systems - He Changed Our World - tribute to the Level I BASIC user manual's personification of the computer

Microcomputer software
BASIC interpreters
BASIC programming language family